"The Bear Went Over the Mountain" is a campfire song sung to the tune of For He's a Jolly Good Fellow which, in turn, got its melody from the French tune Malbrough s'en va-t-en guerre (Marlborough has left for the war).

The public domain lyrics are of unknown origin.

Bing Crosby included the song in a medley on his 1961 album 101 Gang Songs and it is from Kidsongs. It is also a piece of background music from Animaniacs.

Possible origin

Deitsch folklorist Don Yoder postulates that the song may have its origins in Germanic traditions similar to Grundsaudaag, or Groundhog Day. Groundhog Day is known to have its roots in the behavior of badgers in Germany. In some German-speaking areas, however, the foxes or bears were seen as the weather prognosticators. When the behavior of the bear was considered, the belief was that the bear would come out of his lair to check whether he could see "over the mountain." If the weather was clear, the bear would put an end to hibernation and demolish his lair. If it rained or snowed, however, the bear would return to his lair for six more weeks.

References

External links
Lyrics

English children's songs
Songs about bears
Songs about mountains